Pratap Govindrao Pawar is an Indian industrialist, and chairman and managing director at Sakal Papers Pvt. Ltd. The Government of India awarded him Padma Shri award in 2014 for his contribution to trade and industry in India.

Career
Pawar is a former president of the Maharashtra Chamber of Commerce, Industries and Agriculture (MCCIA), Pune, the Indian Newspaper Society and Indian Language Newspapers Association. He is a member of the executive committee of the World Association of Newspapers and News Publishers, Paris and a UGC-nominee at the Press Council of India. He also serves on the director boards of several companies and is a recipient of the Punyabhushan Award. The Government of India awarded him the fourth highest civilian honour of the Padma Shri, in 2014, for his contributions to trade and industry.

Personal life
Pawar is younger brother of Nationalist Congress Party (NCP) leader Sharad Pawar.

Awards
 2014 - Padma Shri award
 2015 - Punyabhushan award

References

Living people
Recipients of the Padma Shri in trade and industry
Businesspeople from Pune
20th-century Indian businesspeople
Year of birth missing (living people)